The Old Seminary Building, also known as Old Masonic Lodge or Lawrencevile Female Seminary Building, is a building in Lawrenceville, Georgia, USA, that was built in 1854 in Greek Revival and Federal style.  It was originally constructed as a school but has had various tenants through the years, most notably Lawrenceville Lodge No. 131 Free and Accepted Masons, who used the second story of the building for meetings for more than a century.

Later, it housed the Gwinnett History Museum and was open by appointment with the Gwinnett Environmental & Heritage Center.

It was listed on the National Register of Historic Places in 1970.

References

External links
 Lawrenceville Female Seminary - Gwinnett Environmental & Heritage Center
 Lawrenceville Female Seminary historical marker

Properties of religious function on the National Register of Historic Places in Georgia (U.S. state)
Federal architecture in Georgia (U.S. state)
Greek Revival architecture in Georgia (U.S. state)
School buildings completed in 1854
Buildings and structures in Gwinnett County, Georgia
Former Masonic buildings in Georgia (U.S. state)
Museums in Gwinnett County, Georgia
National Register of Historic Places in Gwinnett County, Georgia